UGC 5497 is a dwarf galaxy, located about 12 million light years away in the constellation Ursa Major. It is a member of the M81 Group.

See also
 Lists of galaxies

References

Dwarf galaxies
M81 Group
05497
Ursa Major (constellation)